Giancarlo Morpugo was an Italian bobsledder. He competed in the four-man event at the 1928 Winter Olympics.

References

Year of birth missing
Year of death missing
Italian male bobsledders
Olympic bobsledders of Italy
Bobsledders at the 1928 Winter Olympics
Place of birth missing